Sandau is a town in the district of Stendal, in Sachsen-Anhalt, Germany. It is situated on the right bank of the Elbe, approx.  south of Havelberg. It is part of the Verbandsgemeinde ("collective municipality") Elbe-Havel-Land.

The Sandau Ferry, a cable ferry across the Elbe, connects Sandau to Büttnershof.

References

Towns in Saxony-Anhalt
Stendal (district)